No. 353 Squadron RAF was a Royal Air Force squadron, active during World War II carrying out maritime patrol and transport tasks.

History
No. 353 Squadron was formed on 1 June 1942 at Dum Dum, British India from 62 Squadron RAF and 103 (Coast Defence) Flight, Indian Air Force. The squadron was engaged in coastal patrols over the Bay of Bengal equipped with Lockheed Hudson aircraft. In August 1943 the squadron moved to Palam and was assigned to transport duties. From 1944 onwards the squadron re-equipped with Douglas Dakotas, and also operated a number of Avro Anson aircraft, which were replaced with Expeditors in January 1945. The squadron became fully Dakota equipped by April 1945, but disbanded at RAF Mauripur on 1 October 1946.

Aircraft operated

Squadron bases

Commanding officers

References

Notes

Bibliography

External links
 Squadron history on (old) MOD site
 Squadron history on (new) MOD site
 Squadron histories for nos. 353–361 squadron on "Air of Authority – A History of RAF Organisation"

Aircraft squadrons of the Royal Air Force in World War II
353 Squadron
Military units and formations established in 1942
Military units and formations disestablished in 1946